Gaya Island is a sizeable Malaysian island of 1,465 ha, just 10 minutes off Kota Kinabalu, Sabah and forms part of the Tunku Abdul Rahman National Park. Gaya Island derived its name from the Bajau word "Gayo" which means big and occupies an area of 15 km2 (3,700 acres) with an elevation of up to 300 metres.  Several ridges rise more than 600 feet (180 m), peaking at 1,000 feet (300 m), along the backbone of Gaya Island.

Gaya is the largest island in the Tunku Abdul Rahman National Park, closest to downtown Kota Kinabalu (KK) and is covered with dense virgin, tropical forest. It has been a forest reserve since 1923. The island has 20 km of hiking trails and three 5 star resorts named Gayana Marine Resort, home to the Marine Ecology Research Centre, the neighboring Gaya Island Resort (by YTL Hotel Group), the Bunga Raya Island Resort on the north-east part of the island.  Historically, Gaya Island was also the site of the English colonialist's British North Borneo Company's harbour, razed by the folk hero Mat Salleh on 9 July 1897.

In recent years, there has been a plan to turn Gaya Island into a city island and tourism hub. A cable car line has also been proposed before to connect with the city centre.

History
Before the Ice Age, it formed part of the Crocker Range mass of sandstone and sedimentary rock on the mainland. However, about one million years ago, the melting ice brought about changes in the sea level and parts of the mainland were cut off by the sea to form the islands of Gaya Island, Sapi Island, Manukan Island, Mamutik Island and Sulug Island. Evidence of this can be seen from the exposed sandstone of the coastline forming the cliffs, caves, honeycombs and deep crevices.

In 1882, the North Borneo Chartered Company set up a trading settlement on Gaya Island. After destruction in 1898 the settlement was moved to the mainland in 1899 and named as Jesselton in honour of Charles Jessel, a manager of the Chartered Company. Later it was renamed to its current name, Kota Kinabalu.

The park is spread over 4,929 hectares, two thirds of which cover the sea.

Illegal settlement 

Starting from 1970s, Filipino-Moro refugees comprising Tausūg and Bajau peoples began to inhabit the island in their bid to escape from the war in the southern Philippines. Both the Malaysian federal government and the Sabah state government do not officially recognise the settlement and the inhabitants as they are known as illegal immigrants. The eastern shore of Gaya Island supports a well-known illegal Filipino colony, called Kampung Lok Urai, with stilt houses girdling the beach as far as the eye can see. It has a 6,000 floating population of largely Filipinos who provide Kota Kinabalu with a source of cheap labour. It is considered a dangerous, high crime or "no-go" area by the police and KK-ian locals. The stilt houses are linked by walkways of weathered planks. As the population grew, new houses spread seaward, with no regard for sanitation. The population in the island have also been criticised for their rubbish throwing attitude, where most of the rubbish will be found floating around the sea near their settlements. Three fires in 1994, 1998 and in 2014 have wiped out nearly half of Kampung Pondo.

The Sabah state government has since been working to end the Filipino squatter problems that have become the main cause for rampant crimes, terrorism and drug trafficking in the state, especially in the capital city, as their location is too close within business areas, by relocating these squatters to a proper place for proper management, while many of the problematic, illegal immigrants will be deported back to the Philippines and their further entry will be prevented. After the fire in Kampung Pondo on 2014, the Sabah state government has proposed to move the illegal immigrants in the island to Kinarut with a better facility of modern houses. This proposal has been vehemently opposed by the Sabahan citizens, including some demands addressed to the current Chief Minister to resign for mishandling his power. In late 2016, the state government submitted recommendations to the Malaysian federal government through the Main Committee on Management of Foreigners to move any refugee placement schemes in the state to other more suitable locations far from the towns and industrial development areas.

The squatters relocation is in line with the Kota Kinabalu metropolitan development to turn Gaya Island into a city island and tourism hub.

Administration 
Sabah Parks, the body charged with protecting the Tunku Abdul Rahman Park, is headquartered on the south-eastern part of Gaya Island in a bay shared with the Downbelow Marine & Wildlife Adventures dive station. A development on the edge of Gaya island nearest to Sapi island is also used by Sabah Parks and offers a small, quiet beach for public recreational use.

Tourism 

Gaya Island is well known for a legendary beach at Police Bay. The 400 metres (0.25 mile) stretch of white sand, gently slopes out to the sea and makes Police Beach ideal for swimming in the crystal clear water. Police Beach fronts the upmarket Bunga Raya Island Resort. The coral reefs along the entire coast of Gaya island are in excellent condition, making it a surprisingly good diving destination, considering its proximity to Kota Kinabalu city.

Transportation

Jesselton Point Ferry Terminal in downtown Kota Kinabalu is the ferry terminal for those heading to the islands in Tunku Abdul Rahman National Park (Gaya Island, Sapi Island, Manukan Island, Mamutik Island and Sulug Island). This ferry terminal is also the departure point for patrons staying at either Manukan Island Resort or Gayana Resort. While the speedboat owners on the island are kept busy, ferrying Filipinos schoolchildren, housewives and traders who sell craftwork at the Filipino market in the Kota Kinabalu Waterfront.

See also 
 List of islands of Malaysia

References

Further reading

External links 
 Gaya Island on Sabah Parks

Islands of Sabah